SMA Rashidul Hasan (193214 December 1971) was a Bengali educationist. He was born in the district of Birbhum, West Bengal. In 1949, he migrated to East Pakistan. He was awarded Independence Day Award in 2018 posthumously by the Government of Bangladesh.

Education and career
Hasan obtained his BA (Hons.) and MA in English from University of Dhaka in 1957 and 1958, respectively. He taught at various colleges including Narsingdi, Pabna Edward College, and Krishna Chandra College of Bhirbhum in West Bengal. Finally, he joined the University of Dhaka English Department in 1967. He was a liberal democrat and a lifelong fighter against fundamentalism and communism.

Death

On 20 September 1971, the Pakistani occupation army arrested Hasan, but with the help of a friend of his he returned 12 days later unharmed. On the morning of 14 December, two days before independence, Hasan was taken together with his close friend Anwar Pasha from the same flat within the University of Dhaka campus by the Al Badar forces. The two families were then living together in a flat in the Isa Khan Road area.
After 22 days of his disappearance, his decomposed body was found in the Mirpur killing ground and buried in the compound of the Dhaka University Central  mosque.

On 3 November 2013, Chowdhury Mueen-Uddin, a Muslim leader based in London, and Ashrafuz Zaman Khan, based in the United States, were sentenced in absentia after the court found that they were involved in the abduction and murders of 18 people in December 1971 - nine University of Dhaka teachers including Rashidul Hasan and Anwar Pasha, six journalists and three physicians.

See also
 1971 Bangladesh atrocities

References

1932 births
1971 deaths
Bangladeshi murder victims
University of Dhaka alumni
People murdered in Bangladesh
People killed in the Bangladesh Liberation War
Recipients of the Independence Day Award
Educators from West Bengal